The grey-throated warbler (Myiothlypis cinereicollis) is a species of bird in the family Parulidae.

It is found in Colombia and Venezuela. Its natural habitats are subtropical or tropical moist montane forests and heavily degraded former forest. It is becoming rare due to habitat loss. There are three sub-species;

 Myiothlypis cinereicollis cinereicollis (found in central Colombia to W Venezuela)
 Myiothlypis cinereicollis pallidula (extreme NW of Sierra de Perijá. and N Colombia)
 Myiothlypis cinereicollis zuliensis (Sierra de Perijá, Colombia, and NW Venezuela)

References

grey-throated warbler
Birds of the Colombian Andes
Birds of the Venezuelan Andes
grey-throated warbler
grey-throated warbler
Taxonomy articles created by Polbot